The 1987 Bristol Open was a men's tennis tournament played on outdoor grass courts that was part of the 1987 Nabisco Grand Prix. It was the eighth edition of the tournament and was played at Bristol, England from 15 until 22 June 1987. Unseeded Kelly Evernden won the singles title. The doubles event was not played.

Finals

Singles

 Kelly Evernden defeated  Tim Wilkison 6–4, 7–6
 It was Evernden's 1st title of the year and the 2nd of his career.

References

External links
 ITF tournament edition details

 
Bristol Open
Bristol Open
June 1987 sports events in the United Kingdom